= From Monday =

From Monday (Bulgarian: От понеделник) is the first original play of the actress and screenwriter Gergana Shumkova (Bulgarian: Гергана Шумкова).

The play opened on 19 March 2012, under the direction of Ekaterina Kazakova, who also managed scenery and props. The music director was Peter Kuzmov and the choreographer was Maya Petrova. The cast members for the season were: Zlatina Darakova, Georgi Grozev, Ivelin Iliev, Darius Nikolova, Stanslav Peev, Elizabeth Popova, Gergana Shumkova, Assen Stoev, and Vladimir Tsvetkov. In the 2014 season, Konstantin Lungov replaced Vladimir Tsvetkov.

The performance is a drama, which examines family relationships, the eternal search for love, and the fear of not being accepted as you are. It considers the average person, and how they deal with the serious problems of life, in a bittersweet look at the sometimes funny, sometimes sad questions that confront people living their everyday lives.
